Tô Ligado em Você is the third studio album by Brazilian music duo Sandy & Junior. It was first released by Philips and PolyGram in 1992. Unlike the first two albums, where country music was the main influence, the genres explored in this album are rhythms and styles of the 1950s, as well as pop music and ballads. In an interview with IstoÉ newspaper, Sandy said that the first albums had a country influence because of their father, Xororó (from the duo Chitãozinho & Xororó), but that later she and Junior made their own choices.

For the release of the album, Sandy and Junior appeared on television programs with the same look as on the cover of the album, inspired by the 1950s and the film Grease (which, in turn, was the inspiration for Sandy's name). "Tô Ligado Em Você", one of the album's tracks, is a version of one of the Grease song "You're The One That I Want".

The track "Primeiro Amor" is a version of the song "First Love", which was popular due to a recording by singer Nikka Costa. In addition to a substantial number of TV appearances and a national tour, a special feature was shown on Rede Manchete, where almost all of the tracks on the album were performed. They were also interviewed by Jô Soares on the notble late night show Jô Soares Onze e Meia, where they performed "Splish, Splash" live. Tô Ligado em Você was certified gold by Pro-Música Brasil.

Track listing

Certifications and sales

References

External links 
 Tô Ligado em Você at Discogs

Sandy & Junior albums
1993 albums
Children's music albums by Brazilian artists
Portuguese-language albums